Fraser's delma (Delma fraseri) is a species of lizard in the Pygopodidae family endemic to Western Australia.

References

Pygopodids of Australia
Delma
Reptiles described in 1831
Taxa named by John Edward Gray
Endemic fauna of Australia
Reptiles of Western Australia